The 1917–18 Gold Cup was the 6th edition of the Gold Cup, a cup competition in Irish football.

The tournament was won by Linfield for the second time.

Group standings

References

1917–18 in Irish association football